The Hun River in Northeast China, is the largest tributary on the right (Chinese) side of the Yalu River. It starts in the Longgang mountains of northwest Jiangyuan District, Baishan, Jilin Province, runs 446.5 kilometres through Tonghua and Huanren Manchu Autonomous County of Liaoning Province, and empties into the Yalu River at Hunjiang Village of Kuandian Manchu Autonomous County.

Name
The Hun River Basin is the place of origin of the Manchu Tunggiya clan. Thus the river is known as the Tunggiya ula in the Manchu language.

History
The Hun River's drainage basin is the birthplace of the Goguryeo.

References

Rivers of Jilin
Rivers of Liaoning